Novel: A Forum on Fiction is a triannual peer-reviewed academic journal published by Duke University Press. The editor-in-chief is Nancy Armstrong (Duke University). It is the official journal of the Society for Novel Studies. The journal was established in 1967 and publishes essays "concerned with the novel's role in engaging and shaping the world".

Abstracting and indexing 
The journal is abstracted and indexed in Humanities and Social Sciences Index Retrospective, Humanities Index Online, Humanities Index Retrospective, Literature Online, OmniFile Full Text, and Periodicals Index Online.

External links 
 
 Society for Novel Studies

Duke University Press academic journals
Triannual journals
Literary magazines published in the United States
English-language journals
Publications established in 1967